Osizweni, also known as Mountain View or Mawunteni, is a township in Newcastle, KwaZulu-Natal, South Africa, situated  from Newcastle CBD.  Osizweni is one of the largest townships in the province with an estimated population of 80,000 people.

Sections
The township has 6 different sections:
 Section A consists of these areas Top Rank, Ema 4, Evezi, Ward 5
 Section B Mlazi
 Section C Ematsheketsheni
 Section D Emaskophasini
 Section E Long Homes
 Section F Ematshotshombeni

Amenities
Four government-owned medical clinics serve the community of Osizweni and surrounding area.  The Osizweni Medical Centre was recently opened with three doctors. There is a SASSA office in the middle of the township.

Retail

Osizweni Shopping Centre is situated at the heart of the township and it has popular retailers like boxer Stores Limited and Pep and other few supermarkets like Five Star supermarket.

Recently a new Shopping complex has been built between Osizweni and Madadeni in the place called eTheku. Retailers like Shoprite, Pep and many more. Population has grown boosted by neighboring rural citizens like, Umsinga, Nquthu and as far as Vryheid who moved to Osizweni. Transport is accessibly as the local taxi is operating to transport people around Dicks, Mndozo, Lister, Masondeza and Manzane.

Sports and Recreation

Osizweni has a soccer stadium, netball courts and a cricket Stadium.  The Osizweni Park offers a safe environment for children to play. There is one library in the township.

Safety and Security

There is one police station in the township. Osizweni Police Station has overnight cells and is situated behind to Osizweni Community Hall and Osizweni Library.

Notable residents

Osizweni is home to some of South Africa's top soccer players, including Siyabonga Nkosi and Sizwe Motaung. (Helman Mkhalele), (Fani Madida), (Mark Fish), (Njiyela)  Bonginkosi "Zola" Dlamini also lived there when he was younger.  Other famous people from the township include Thokozani "L'Vovo" Ndlovu, Pastor Khathide, Thokozani 'HustlaDJ' Nkwanyana and Former Miss South Africa Peggy-Sue Khumalo, Lucky Dube and Bongi Dube.
DJ Thulani Alex 15 now based in Joburg ( Alexandra) Former eTV's Sunrise, eNCA and now SABC Television Newsreader 'Calvin Dludla' is also from Osizweni & former President of South African students in Tambov Medical university Dr Mhlengi Mmeli Mhlongo.
and also the home of former Golden Arrows, Chippa United, Thanda Royal Zulu and AmaZulu player Sifiso Sandile "Choppa" Hlanti who is currently at Bidvest Wits and Bafana Bafana.

References

Townships in KwaZulu-Natal
Populated places in the Newcastle Local Municipality
 SABC newsreader Calvin Dludla and Simphiwe Mthethwa are also from Newcastle, Osizweni and Madadeni respectively.